Dave Whittle (born ) is a former Wales international rugby league footballer who played in the 1990s and 2000s.

Whittle was born in Wigan, Greater Manchester, England, and he played for Wales at the 2000 Rugby League World Cup.

Whittle made his début for Warrington Wolves on Friday 17 August 2001, and he played his last match for Warrington Wolves on Friday 31 August 2001.

References

External links
Statistics at wolvesplayers.thisiswarrington.co.uk
Statistics at wolvesplayers.thisiswarrington.co.uk (martini)

1976 births
Living people
Chorley Lynx players
English rugby league players
Leigh Leopards players
Rugby league players from Wigan
Rugby league props
St Helens R.F.C. players
Wales national rugby league team players
Warrington Wolves players
Rugby articles needing expert attention